Sue Williamson (born 1941) is an artist and writer based in Cape Town, South Africa.

Life 
Sue Williamson was born in Lichfield, England in 1941. In 1948 she immigrated with her family to South Africa. Between 1963 and 1965 she studied at the Art Students League of New York. In 1983 she earned her Advanced Diploma in Fine Art from the Michaelis School of Fine Art, Cape Town. In 2007 she received the Visual Arts Research Award from the Smithsonian Institution in Washington D.C and in 2011 the Rockefeller Foundation Bellagio Creative Arts Fellowship. In 2013 she was a guest curator of the summer academy at the Zentrum Paul Klee in Bern.

Work 

Williamson's work engages with themes related to memory and identity formation. Trained as a printmaker, Williamson has worked across a variety of media including archival photography, video, mixed media installations, and constructed objects.

In One Hundred and Nineteen Deeds of Sale (2018), the names given by slave masters, ages, sexes, and places of birth, along with the names of buyers and sellers, prices paid, and the date of purchase of people from the slave trade in India are written in black ink on cotton shirts. The shirts are imported from India, dipped into muddy waters drawn from the Cape Coast Castle, and hung around the grounds until Heritage Day, September 24, 2019. They are then taken down and returned to India, where they are washed clean and rehung as an installation at the Aspinwall House in Kochi. These people were transported by Dutch East India Company to work at the Cape Town Castle and the Company's Gardens. One Hundred and Nineteen Deeds of Sale Williamson incorporates the history and memory of the slave trade in order to transform the stigmatizing history into a history that can address and combat global inequalities. Upon opening the exhibition, Williamson read extracts of historical accounts while a woman picked up each shirt, read out the information on it, and then took it inside to be dipped in mud and hung on a washing line. Art brings history of slave trade to life The installation tells a story of loss and symbolizes the essence of a person that is floating in the wind, but all that remains is their memory.

Williamson has produced many forms of resistance art that examines the history of South Africa. and in 2009 set her artistic view to exploring globalization with her ongoing piece, Other Voices, Other Cities, which was included in Push the Limits. exhibition, of February 2021, in Italy.She is the founding editor of “Artthrob.co.za”.

Public collections 
Williamson's work is in the collection of a variety of museums, including the Museum of Modern Art in New York, the National Museum of African Art - Smithsonian Institution in Washington D.C., the South African National Gallery in Cape Town, and the Victoria and Albert Museum in London. Williamson has also participated in group exhibitions including The Short Century (2001), Liberated Voices (1999), the Johannesburg Art Biennale (in 1997 and 1995), the Havana Biennale (1994), and the Venice Biennale (1993).

Selected exhibitions 

 2000 Messages from the Moat, Archive Building, Den Haag, the Netherlands
 2001 Can't forget, can't remember, Iziko South African National Gallery, Cape Town, South Africa
 2002 The Last Supper Revisited National Museum of African Art, Smithsonian Institution, Washington D.C., USA
 2003 Sue Williamson: Selected Work, Centre d’Art Contemporain, Brussels, Belgium*
 2004 Messages from the Moat, Castle of Good Hope, Cape Town
 2009 The Truth is on the Walls, Wifredo Lam Centre, Havana, 10th Havana Biennale, Cuba*
 2012 The Mothers: a 31 Year Chronicle, Castle of Good Hope, Cape Town
 2014 There's something I must tell you, Iziko Slave Lodge, Cape Town
 2015 Other Voices, Other Cities, SCAD Museum, Savannah, Georgia, USA
 2016 Other Voices, Other Cities, SCAD Atlanta: Gallery 1600, Georgia, USA
 2017 Can't Forget, Can't Remember, Apartheid Museum, Johannesburg, South Africa
 2017 Being There: South Africa, a contemporary scene, Foundation Louis Vuitton, Paris, France
 2017 "Messages from the Atlantic Passage", Installation, Basel Unlimited, Basel, Switzerland

Publications 
In 1997 Williamson established ArtThrob, an online publication that features the work of contemporary South African artists.

References

General references 
 Grania Ogilvy, Dictionary of South African Sculptors and Painters, Everard Read, 1989.
 Betty La Duke, Africa through the Eyes of Women Artists, Africa World Press, 1991.
 Richard J Powell, Black Art and Culture in the 20th Century, World of Art Series, Thames & Hudson, 1997.
 Philippa Hobbs & Elizabeth Rankin, Printmaking in a transforming South Africa, David Philip Publishers, Cape Town, 1997.
 Olu Oguibe & Okwui Enwezor, Reading the Contemporary: African Art from Theory to Marketplace, MIT Press, 1999.
 Sidney Littlefield, Contemporary African Art, Thames & Hudson, 1999.
 N'Gone Fall & Jean Pivin, Anthologie de l'Art Africain du Xxe Siecle, Revue Noir, 2001.
 
 Nicholas M. Dawes, Sue Williamson: Selected Work, Juta and Company Ltd, 2003.
 Emma Bedford and Sophie Perryer, 10 Years 100 Artists: Art In A Democratic South Africa, Struik, 2004.
 Petra Stegmann, Sue Williamson in Culturebase, 2007.

External links 
 
 Sue Williamson on South African History Online

1941 births
Living people
South African contemporary artists
20th-century South African women artists
21st-century South African women artists
People from Lichfield
English emigrants to South Africa
Art Students League of New York alumni